Events from the year 1805 in Russia

Incumbents
 Monarch – Alexander I

Events

 Treaty of Saint Petersburg (1805)
 Moscow Society of Naturalists
 Kharkov National Medical University
 Alexander Garden (Saint Petersburg)

Births

Deaths

References

1805 in Russia
Years of the 19th century in the Russian Empire